GNU FreeFont (also known as Free UCS Outline Fonts) is a family of free OpenType, TrueType and WOFF vector fonts, implementing as much of the Universal Character Set (UCS) as possible, aside from the very large CJK Asian character set.  The project was initiated in 2002 by Primož Peterlin and is now maintained by Steve White.

The family includes three faces: FreeMono, FreeSans, and FreeSerif, each in four styles (Regular, Italic/Oblique, Bold, and Bold Italic/Oblique).

The fonts are licensed under the GPL-3.0-or-later license with the Font-exception-2.0, ensuring they may be both freely distributed and embedded or otherwise utilized within a document without the document itself being covered by the GPL. The fonts can be obtained libre from GNU Savannah. They are also packaged on certain Linux distributions, including Ubuntu and Arch Linux.

Design
The glyphs of GNU FreeFont come from many sources, all of which are compatible with the GPL.

The core Latin characters are derived from the Type 1 fonts donated by URW++ Design & Development GmbH to the Ghostscript project. Specifically, the design notes of GNU FreeFont  state that:

 FreeSerif is based on URW++ Nimbus Roman No. 9 L, which is similar to Times
 FreeSans is based on URW++ Nimbus Sans L, which is similar to Helvetica
 FreeMono is based on URW++ Nimbus Mono L, which is similar to Courier

The Greek, Cyrillic, Armenian, Hebrew, Arabic, and International Phonetic Alphabet (IPA) characters are partially based on Omega, which is an extension of TeX. The Greek characters are also based on a set of Greek Type 1 fonts compiled by Angelo Haritsis, in addition to Alexey Kryukov's Tempora LCG Unicode. The Cyrillic range also includes Valek Filipov's Gnome Cyrillic and Tempora LCG Unicode. Valek Filippov further added some composite Latin Extended-A glyphs.

The Devanagari range in serif is from the Velthuis TeX font, while the range in sans is based on Gargi; Bengali and Gurmukhi ranges are based on Harsh Kumar's BharatBhasha project and others.  The Gujarati and Oriya ranges are based on Samyak fonts.  The Ethiopic range is based on the Ethiopic metafont project at the University of Hamburg.

Unicode coverage

In the latest release of 2012-05-03, FreeSerif includes 10,537 glyphs, FreeSans includes 6,272 glyphs, and FreeMono includes 4,178 glyphs.

The family covers characters from the following Unicode blocks: 

Basic Latin
Latin-1 Supplement
Latin Extended-A
Latin Extended-B
International Phonetic Alphabet (IPA) Extensions
Spacing Modifier Letters
Combining Diacritical Marks
Greek
Cyrillic
Cyrillic Supplement
Arabic
Hebrew
N'Ko
Thaana
Syriac
Armenian
Georgian
Devanagari
Bengali
Gujarati
Gurmukhi
Oriya
Sinhala
Tamil
Malayalam
Tai Le
Ethiopic
Thai
Kayah Li
Cherokee
Unified Canadian Aboriginal Syllabics
Hanunóo
Buginese
Vai
Phonetic Extensions
Phonetic Extensions Supplement
Diacritical marks
Cyrillic Extended-B
Tifinagh
Osmanya
Coptic
Glagolitic
Gothic
Ugaritic
Old Persian
Phoenician
Runic
Braille
Supplemental Arrows-A
Latin Extended Additional
Greek Extended
General Punctuation
Super and Sub scripts
Currency Symbols
Letterlike Symbols
Number Forms
Arrows
Mathematical Operators
Miscellaneous Technical Symbols
Enclosed Alphanumerics
Box Drawing
Block Elements
Geometric Shapes
Miscellaneous Symbols
Dingbats
Alphabetic Presentation Forms
Vietnamese
Western music
Byzantine music
Mah Jong tiles
Dominoes

See also
Free software Unicode fonts
List of typefaces
Unicode typefaces

References

External links
GNU FreeFont
Free UCS Outline Fonts Project

Free software Unicode typefaces
FreeFont
Computer-related introductions in 2002